Resolve is the second studio album by British musician Poppy Ackroyd. It was released on 2 February 2018, under One Little Independent Records.

Critical reception

Resolve was met with "generally favorable" reviews from critics. At Metacritic, which assigns a weighted average rating out of 100 to reviews from mainstream publications, this release received an average score of 77, based on 7 reviews. Aggregator Album of the Year gave the release a 75 out of 100 based on a critical consensus of 7 reviews.

Track listing

Personnel

Musicians
 Poppy Ackroyd – primary artist, piano, producer
 Manu Delago – idiophone
 Mike Lesirge – clarinet
 Jo Quail – cello

Production
 Joe Acheson – mixer
 Mandy Parnell – mastering

References

2018 albums
One Little Independent Records albums